Lionel-Groulx station is a Montreal Metro station in the borough of Le Sud-Ouest in Montreal, Quebec, Canada. It is operated by the Société de transport de Montréal (STM) and is a transfer station between the Green Line and Orange Line, with cross-platform interchange available. It is located in the Saint-Henri area. If transfers between lines are included, the station is one of the busiest on the Metro. It first opened in 1978.

History 
The station opened on September 3, 1978 as part of the extension of the Green Line to Angrignon, with service on the Green Line only, though the Orange Line platforms were built at the same time. They did not enter service until the extension to Place-Saint-Henri was opened on April 28, 1980. It was therefore the first transfer station to open after Berri-UQAM, in the original network.

In 2009 it became the first existing station to be retrofitted to be fully wheelchair-accessible through the addition of elevators. Berri-UQAM station had elevators added at the same time, but only between the mezzanine and Orange Line platforms. (The three stations in Laval, opened in 2007, already had elevators.) Three elevators connect the entrance to the mezzanine, the mezzanine to the upper platform, and the upper platform to the lower platform, respectively.

Architecture and art 

The station, built in open cut, features stacked platforms with central platforms between the lines; the Orange Line is to the south and the Green Line to the north. The platforms are arranged in an anti-directional cross-platform interchange, with the two inbound lines (Montmorency and Honoré-Beaugrand) on the upper level, and the two outbound lines (Côte-Vertu and Angrignon) on the lower level. This allows the majority of passengers to transfer by simply walking across the platform, without having to go up or down stairs. The station's mezzanine, suspended on beams, is located above the upper platform, and gives access to the single entrance. The orange, yellow and red circular tiles on the platform floor recall the multi-colored maple leaves that typically carpet the city’s sidewalks, parks and surrounding woodlands in autumn.

The station was designed by Yves Roy. It contains two artworks: a pair of stainless steel mural sculptures by the architect over the mezzanine, and in the mezzanine itself, a sculpture called The Tree of Life by Italian artist Joseph Rifesser. Representing the races of humanity growing from a common root, it was carved from the entire trunk of a walnut tree, it was originally located at Man and His World and was given to the Metro by the United Nations.

The station is equipped with the MétroVision information screens which displays news, commercials, and the time till the next train.

Station layout

Origin of the name
This station is named for rue Lionel-Groulx, which had its name changed to allow the station to commemorate Lionel Groulx. Groulx, one of the most influential of Quebec historians, founded the Franco-American History Institute in 1946 and edited the Revue d'histoire de l'Amérique française from 1947 to 1967.

In November 1996, the League for Human Rights of B'nai Brith Canada officially requested that the Executive Committee of the Montreal Urban Community (M.U.C.) recommend a name change to the station, due to anti-Semitic statements and positions made and maintained by Lionel Groulx. 

Likewise, there has been a recent movement to rename the station in honour of Oscar Peterson. The movement was originally started as a virtual petition, but has recently been picked up by the media. The issue was politicized and fraught in controversy as global monuments and statues celebrating controversial historical icons were called in to question.

Connecting bus routes
The 77 MUHC shuttle is abolished on August 23, 2021, as Vendôme station became accessible and provides accessible path to the MUHC Glen Site.

Nearby points of interest
Atwater Market
Église Saint-Irénée
Union United Church
Parc du Canal de Lachine
CÉDA (Comité d'éducation aux adultes)
Solin Hall (Off-Campus Residence of McGill University)

Film and television appearances
Scenes of the Bruce Willis-Richard Gere film The Jackal were shot in this station, redressed to stand in for the Metro Center station on the Washington Metro.
Scenes from the Marvel Comics film Punisher: War Zone were also shot in this station, as the entrance to the Punisher's lair.
Scenes from the movie Catch Me If You Can starring Leonardo DiCaprio and Tom Hanks were also shot in this station.
The station entrance appears in many Just for Laughs: Gags pranks.

References

External links

Lionel-Groulx Station — official web page
Lionel-Groulx metro station geo location
Montreal by Metro, metrodemontreal.com — Photos, information, and trivia
 Metro Map
 STM 2011 System Map

Accessible Montreal Metro stations
Green Line (Montreal Metro)
Orange Line (Montreal Metro)
Le Sud-Ouest
Railway stations in Canada opened in 1978